Maridjo Wirjodemedjo (born 20 December 1927) was an Indonesian athlete. He competed in the men's high jump at the 1956 Summer Olympics.

References

External links
 

1927 births
Possibly living people
Athletes (track and field) at the 1956 Summer Olympics
Indonesian male high jumpers
Olympic athletes of Indonesia
Place of birth missing